Bilād al-ʻArab Awṭānī or The Arab Lands are my Nations is a national Pan-Arabism song that is recited in the Arabic language. It is unofficially recognized as the Arab World's national anthem, and is written by Fakhri Al-Baroodi and composed by the Folayfel brothers.

Lyrics

بلادُ العُربِ أوطاني منَ الشّـامِ لبغدانِ 
ومن نجدٍ إلى يَمَـنٍ إلى مِصـرَ فتطوانِ

The Arab lands is my nation, from the Levant to Baghdad
From Najd to Yemen to Egypt to Tétouan

فـلا حـدٌّ يباعدُنا ولا ديـنٌ يفـرّقنا 
لسان الضَّادِ يجمعُنا بغـسَّانٍ وعـدنانِ

No Borders can separate us, and no religion can divide us
The Language of Ḍād (Arabic) unites us, Ghassanids and Adnani

بلادُ العُربِ أوطاني من الشّـامِ لبغدانِ 
ومن نجدٍ إلى يمـنٍ إلى مصـرَ فتطوانِ

The Arab Lands are my Nations, from the Levant to Baghdad
From Najd to Yemen to Egypt to Tétouan

لنا مدنيّةُ سَـلفَـتْ سنُحييها وإنْ دُثرَتْ 
ولو في وجهنا وقفتْ دهاةُ الإنسِ و الجانِ

We have a Civilization that has passed, we will revive it if it dies
Even if against us, stood the shrewds of Humanity and Jinn

بلادُ العُربِ أوطاني من الشّـامِ لبغدانِ 
ومن نَجدٍ إلى يَمَـنٍ إلى مصـرَ فتطوانِ

The Arab Lands are my Nations, from the Levant to Baghdad
From Najd to Yemen to Egypt to Tétouan

فهبوا يا بني قومي إلى العـلياءِ بالعلمِ 
و غنوا يا بني أمّي بلادُ العُربِ أوطاني

Rise up my fellows, to higher Science
and oh sons of my Mother, sing for your Arab Nations

بلادُ العُربِ أوطاني منَ الشّـام لبغدانِ 
ومن نجدٍ إلى يمـنٍ إلى مِصـرَ فتطوانِ

The Arab Lands are my Nations, from the Levant to Baghdad
From Najd to Yemen to Egypt to Tétouan

History
The song is a very known Arab song, calling for Arab Unity, and focuses on Unity, Education, and keeping traditions and Arab Culture. Following the Arab Spring, the song was widely used as an unofficial Arab National Anthem in several events, including the 2011 Pan Arab Games.
 African anthems
Arab nationalist symbols
 Asian anthems
 Pan-Arabism